The following is a list of Michigan State Historic Sites in Van Buren County, Michigan. Sites marked with a dagger (†) are also listed on the National Register of Historic Places in Van Buren County, Michigan.


Current listings

See also
 National Register of Historic Places listings in Van Buren County, Michigan

Sources
 Historic Sites Online – Van Buren County. Michigan State Housing Developmental Authority. Accessed June 4, 2011.

References

Van Buren County
State Historic Sites